Just Seen It  was a film and television review show created by David Freedman in 2010. It started on YouTube as a tribute to Siskel and Ebert's At the Movies. The first episode appeared on the web in January 2010, and the last episode in January 2015. More than  reviews were produced, covering newly released features, network and cable television shows, new releases on Blu-ray and DVD, and interviews with industry leaders such as director Michael Apted and actor Richard Portnow.

Just Seen It aired on PBS SOCAL/PBS OC, from September 2012 to January 2013, with 20 episodes, and was offered through NETA (National Educational Telecommunications Association) to 370 PBS stations nationwide starting January 16, 2013.

References

External links
 
 
 

2011 American television series debuts
Film criticism television series
Television criticism
American film review websites
2010s YouTube series
PBS original programming
2015 American television series endings